Impact Wrestling is a professional wrestling promotion currently owned by Anthem Sports & Entertainment, based in Toronto, Canada. The promotion's flagship show is Impact! which features all of the talent and major information regarding the promotion. The promotion also has a secondary program called Before the Impact. The majority of Impact Wrestling's archived and former programming can be found digitally on their Impact Plus streaming service, some networks also show archived programming.

The promotion also produces four pay-per-view events every year, and Impact Plus Monthly Specials for its streaming service and selected international TV channels. The company also previously collaborated with other promotions for Twitch specials, which are also broadcast on select international networks.

Television programmings

Pay-per-view

Former programming

See also

List of Impact Wrestling pay-per-view events
List of professional wrestling television series

References

External links
Global Wrestling Network

Impact Wrestling
Impact Wrestling shows
Professional wrestling-related lists